Inhibitory control, also known as response inhibition, is a cognitive process – and, more specifically, an executive function – that permits an individual to inhibit their impulses and natural, habitual, or dominant behavioral responses to stimuli ( prepotent responses) in order to select a more appropriate behavior that is consistent with completing their goals. Self-control is an important aspect of inhibitory control. For example, successfully suppressing the natural behavioral response to eat cake when one is craving it while dieting requires the use of inhibitory control.

The prefrontal cortex, caudate nucleus, and subthalamic nucleus are known to regulate inhibitory control cognition. Inhibitory control is impaired in both addiction and attention deficit hyperactivity disorder. In healthy adults and ADHD individuals, inhibitory control improves over the short term with low (therapeutic) doses of methylphenidate or amphetamine. Inhibitory control may also be improved over the long-term via consistent aerobic exercise.

Tests
An inhibitory control test is a neuropsychological test that measures an individual's ability to override their natural, habitual, or dominant behavioral response to a stimulus in order to implement more adaptive  behaviors.  Some of the neuropsychological tests that measure inhibitory control include the Stroop task, go/no-go task, Simon task, Flanker task, antisaccade tasks, delay of gratification tasks, and stop-signal tasks.

See also

 Neurobiological effects of physical exercise#Cognitive control and memory
 Inhibition of return

References

Neuropsychological tests
Cognition
Addiction
Amphetamine
Attention deficit hyperactivity disorder

External links